Methocha is a genus of parasitoid wasps in the family Thynnidae.

The species of this genus are found worldwide except in Australia, and attack the larvae of tiger beetles. Females are wingless, and can be mistaken for ants, while males are winged.

Biology
Female Methocha actively hunt over the ground for burrows containing tiger beetle larvae, which are ambush predators; the wasp entices the beetle larva into attacking, evades being bitten, and quickly moves in and stings the larva in its vulnerable underside, paralyzing it. It then lays an egg on the immobile beetle larva, and the wasp larva consumes it.

Species

 Methocha alutacea Linnaeus 
 Methocha anomala Krombein
 Methocha californica Westwood, 1881 
 Methocha formosa Krombein, 1954 
 Methocha ichneumonides Latreille, 1804
 Methocha impolita Krombein, 1958 
 Methocha krombeini Raveendram, Kumar, Binoy, & Sureshan, 2021 
 Methocha paraceylonica Raveendram, Kumar, Binoy, & Sureshan, 2021 
 Methocha shyamagatra Raveendram, Kumar, Binoy, & Sureshan, 2021 
 Methocha stygia (Say, 1836)
 Methocha uchinanensis Terayamma & Mita, 2015
 Methocha yaeyamensis Terayamma & Mita, 2015

References

Hymenoptera
Hymenoptera genera